Nicholas Mark Collins (born 23 April 1952 in Cheltenham, Gloucestershire) was the Director of the Commonwealth Foundation from 2005 until 2011. He was replaced as interim director by Dhananjayan Sriskandarajah.

Collins received the Busk Medal of the Royal Geographical Society (RGS) in 2000.

He is the Chairman of the Galapagos Conservation Trust.

References 

 "COLLINS, (Nicholas) Mark", Who's Who 2011, A & C Black, 2011; online edn, Oxford University Press, Dec 2010; online edn, Oct 2010. Accessed 22 May 2011.
 Debrett's.

1952 births
Living people